According to American counter-terrorism analysts the Al-Matar complex was an Afghan training camp run by al Qaeda.

In 1999, Mohammed Atef met repeatedly with Bin Laden and Khalid Sheikh Mohammed at the Al-Matar complex to discuss possible targets for the 9/11 attacks.

According to testimony offered at the trial of Zacarias Moussaoui, Abu Turab al-Urduni—the son-in-law of Ayman al-Zawahiri—provided training to the "muscle" hijackers at the al-Matar complex.
He was alleged to have provided training in how to disarm air marshals, in physical fitness and in basic English phrases. He also alleged to have provided them in training in truck bombings, in blowing up buildings, and in hijacking trains.

Mohammed Zarnuki's Summary of Evidence memo asserted:
{| class="wikitable" border="1"
|
"A source identified Usama bin Laden's compound in Kandahar, Afghanistan called al Matar, which meant the airport."
"A source identified al Farouq, al Matar and Aynak as the three al Qaida military training camps."
|}

Faiz Mohammed Ahmed Al Kandari faced the allegation:
{| class="wikitable" border="1"
|
"An individual stated that the detainee took a course in snipe-shooter  training at the Airport Training Camp near Qandahar, Afghanistan."
|}

References

Al-Qaeda facilities
Buildings and structures in Afghanistan